United Nations Security Council resolution 1023, adopted unanimously on 22 November 1995, after recalling all resolutions on the conflicts in the former Yugoslavia, the Council noted the "Basic Agreement on the Region of Eastern Slavonia, Baranja and Western Sirmium" between the Government of Croatia and local Serb representatives.

The Security Council again stressed the need for a negotiated political solution to the conflicts in the former Yugoslavia, including the mutual recognition of states in the territory. It also noted that Eastern Slavonia, Baranja and Western Sirmium (known as Sector East) are integral parts of Croatia. Importance was attached to respect for human rights and fundamental freedoms in those areas.

The "Basic Agreement on the Region of Eastern Slavonia, Baranja and Western Sirmium" agreement signed on 12 November 1995 was welcomed and the request to establish a transitional authority and international force contained in the agreement was recognised. All parties were urged to co-operate with each other and the United Nations Confidence Restoration Operation.

See also
 Bosnian War
 Breakup of Yugoslavia
 Croatian War of Independence
 SAO Eastern Slavonia, Baranja and Western Syrmia
 List of United Nations Security Council Resolutions 1001 to 1100 (1995–1997)
 Yugoslav Wars
 United Nations Transitional Authority for Eastern Slavonia, Baranja and Western Sirmium
 Joint Council of Municipalities

References

External links
 
Text of the Resolution at undocs.org

 1023
 1023
1995 in Yugoslavia
1995 in Croatia
 1023
 1023
Joint Council of Municipalities
November 1995 events